Dynasty is an American Christian hardcore punk band from Los Angeles, California. The band started making music in 2004, and their members are lead vocalist, Joel Muniz, guitarists, Ivan Hernandez and Marcel Muniz, bassist, Ruben Nunez, and drummer, Nick Sturz. The band released a studio album, Truer Living with a Youthful Vengeance, in 2011 with Strike First Records. Their second studio album, Beyond Measure, was released in 2013 by Facedown Records. The band is performing at Facedown Fest 2017.

Background
Dynasty is a Christian hardcore band from Los Angeles, California. Their members are lead vocalist, Joel Muniz, guitarists, Ivan Hernandez and Marcel Muniz, bassist, Ruben Nunez, and drummer, Nick Sturz.

Music history
The band commenced as a musical entity in 2004 with their first release, Truer Living with a Youthful Vengeance, a studio album, that was released by Strike First Records on May 24, 2011. Their second studio album, Beyond Measure, was released by Facedown Records on January 22, 2013.

Members
Current members
 Joel Muniz - lead vocals
 Ivan Hernandez - guitar
 Marcel Muniz - guitar (Dangerous Minds)
 Ruben Nunez - bass
 Nick Sturz - drums

Discography
Studio albums
 Truer Living with a Youthful Vengeance (May 24, 2011, Strike First)
 Beyond Measure (January 22, 2013, Facedown)

References

External links
Official website

Musical groups from Los Angeles
2004 establishments in California
Musical groups established in 2004
Facedown Records artists
Strike First Records artists